Judge Baker may refer to:

Francis E. Baker (1860–1924), judge of the United States Court of Appeals for the Seventh Circuit
Harold Baker (judge) (born 1929), judge of the United States District Court for the Central District of Illinois
James E. Baker (born 1960), judge of the United States Court of Appeals for the Armed Forces
John Baker (Indiana politician) (1832–1915), judge of the United States District Court for the District of Indiana
Kristine Baker (born 1971), judge of the United States District Court for the Eastern District of Arkansas
R. Stan Baker (born 1977), judge of the United States District Court for the Southern District of Georgia
William E. Baker (1873–1954), judge of the United States District Court for the Northern District of West Virginia

See also
Justice Baker (disambiguation)